Yamnapet is also known as Pogullagudem a village under Pocharam Municipality, Medchal - Malkajgiri District, Telangana, India. Sreenidhi Institute of Science and Technology is located on the borders of this village.

References

Villages in Ranga Reddy district